is an underground metro station located in Naka-ku, Nagoya, Aichi Prefecture, Japan operated by the Nagoya Municipal Subway. It is located 4.3 rail kilometers from the terminus of the Meijō Line at Kanayama Station. This station provides access to its namesake, Nagoya City Hall, as well as Aichi Prefectural Government Office, Nagoya City Archives, Nagoya Noh Theatre and Nagoya Castle.

The station was previously called  and its name was changed on 4 January 2023.

History
The station was opened on 15 October 1965.

Lines

 (Station number: M07)

Layout
Shiyakusho Station has one underground island platform.

Entrance No. 7 has a wooden traditional design that imitates the Komaimon gate of Nagoya Castle.

At the end of the northern exits is a large map of Nagoya Castle during the Edo period. This castle map was produced by the Institute for Cultural Environment Planning Co., Ltd. by Naitō Akira (内藤昌) and Suzuki Norio (鈴木 規夫).

Platforms

References

External links
 Shiyakusho Station official web site 

Railway stations in Japan opened in 1965
Railway stations in Aichi Prefecture